Baruti is a surname. Notable people with the surname include:

Barly Baruti (born 1959), Congolese cartoonist
Gilbert Baruti (born 1992), Botswanan footballer
Mustafa Baruti, 19th-century Albanian politician

Surnames of African origin